Megathymus ursus, known generally as the ursus giant skipper or ursine giant skipper, is a species of giant skipper in the butterfly family Hesperiidae. It is found in Central America and North America.

The MONA or Hodges number for Megathymus ursus is 4151.

Subspecies
These three subspecies belong to the species Megathymus ursus:
 Megathymus ursus deserti R. Wielgus, J. Wielgus & D. Wielgus, 1972
 Megathymus ursus ursus Poling, 1902
 Megathymus ursus violae D. Stallings & Turner, 1956

References

Further reading

 

Megathyminae
Articles created by Qbugbot